Anthony D. DiCicco Jr. (August 5, 1948 – June 19, 2017) was an American soccer player and coach and TV commentator. He is best known as the coach of the United States women's national soccer team from 1994 to 1999, during which time the team won an Olympic gold medal in 1996 and the 1999 FIFA Women's World Cup. He was also coach of the USA team that won the 2008 FIFA U-20 Women's World Cup.

Early life
Born in Wethersfield, Connecticut, DiCicco was 1966 graduate of Wethersfield High School in Wethersfield, Connecticut, where he lettered in soccer, baseball and basketball.

In 1970, DiCicco graduated from Springfield College in Massachusetts, where he was an All-American goalkeeper his senior year.  He played with the Connecticut Wildcats and Rhode Island Oceaneers of the American Soccer League for five years, and made a single appearance for the United States men's national soccer team in 1973. During this time, he also taught Physical Education at Bellows Falls Middle School in Bellows Falls, Vt. for at least the 1972–1973 school year.

Coaching career

International
In 1991, DiCicco became the goalkeeper coach for the U.S. women's team; he was also the goalkeeping coach for the 1993 U.S. men's under-20 team.  He took over as head coach of the women's team in 1994, and compiled a record of 105–8–8, culminating with the team's dramatic win over China in the 1999 World Cup final.

In 2008, DiCicco coached the U.S. U-20 Women's national team to victory in the FIFA Women's U-20 World Cup in Chile.

Club
DiCicco served as head coach of the Boston Breakers of the Women's Professional Soccer from 2009 to 2011.

Sports administration
DiCicco was the founding commissioner of the Women's United Soccer Association from 2000 to 2003. DiCicco has also served on a Technical Advisory board for U.S. Soccer.

Broadcasting
DiCicco worked as a commentator and analyst for ESPN's and Fox Sports' broadcasts of women's soccer, including the main broadcast booth for the 2015 FIFA Women's World Cup.

Writer
DiCicco was co-author of "Catch Them Being Good: Everything You Need to Know to Successfully Coach Girls" with Colleen Hacker and Charles Salzberg.

Honors and awards

Individual
DiCicco was elected to the National Soccer Hall of Fame Class of 2012.

International

Coach
Women's Olympics Soccer (1): 1996

FIFA Women's World Cup (1): 1999

FIFA U-20 Women's World Cup (1): 2008

Personal life
DiCicco and his wife, Diane, have four sons: Anthony, Andrew, Alex, and Nicholas.

DiCicco died on June 19, 2017, from cancer at his home in Wethersfield, Connecticut. He was 68 years old.

References

External links

 U.S. Soccer player bio
  Soccertimes.com profile
 Soccerplus.com profile
 Linkedin.com public profile
 Tony DiCicco, U.S. Women's National Soccer Coach, World Cup Champion – amherst.edu
 
 2015 interview on the state of U.S. soccer development

1948 births
2017 deaths
People from Wethersfield, Connecticut
Sportspeople from Hartford, Connecticut
Soccer players from Connecticut
American soccer players
Association football goalkeepers
United States men's international soccer players
American Soccer League (1933–1983) players
Connecticut Wildcats soccer players
Rhode Island Oceaneers players
American soccer coaches
United States women's national soccer team managers
1995 FIFA Women's World Cup managers
1999 FIFA Women's World Cup managers
FIFA Women's World Cup-winning managers
American color commentators
Association football commentators
American people of Italian descent
American women's soccer coaches
Deaths from cancer in Connecticut
National Soccer Hall of Fame members
Springfield Pride athletes
Women's Professional Soccer coaches
American Olympic coaches
Boston Breakers coaches